Toulouse FC Féminines is a French football representing Toulouse FC. It currently competes in the Division 2 Féminine. Founded in 1980 as Toulouse OAC, the team became a section of Toulouse FC in 2001, at its peak.

Toulouse OAC settled in the top positions of the French First Division in the second half of the 90s and soon became a powerhouse, winning four championships in a row between 1999 and 2002. It was the first team to achieve this since the league's unification in 1992. The latter was their most successful season, as they also won the national Cup and reached the semifinals of the UEFA Women's Cup after topping its group and beating Arsenal FC. The following year Toulouse was defeated by eventual champions Umeå IK in the quarterfinals.

However, Toulouse gradually declined in the following years and was relegated in 2011. As of the end of the year Toulouse tops the category's Group C.

Players

First-team squad 
As of 2 October 2022

Honours 
League
 National 1A / Division 1 Féminine
 Winners (4): 1998–99, 1999–2000, 2000–01, 2001–02
 Runners-up (2): 1994–95, 1996–97

 National 1B / Division 2 Féminine
 Winners (2): 1993–94, 2011–12

 LFO Regional 1 Féminin
 Winners (1): 2021–22

Cups
 Challenge de France / Coupe de France féminine
 Winners (1): 2001–02

Seasons

See also 

 List of football clubs in France
 List of French women's football champions

References 
Notes

Citations

External links 
 Toulouse FC at Soccerway
 Toulouse Football Club at Footoféminin.fr 

 
1980 establishments in France
Association football clubs established in 1980
Division 1 Féminine clubs
Football clubs in Occitania (administrative region)
Sport in Toulouse
Women's football clubs in France